Grønsvik coastal artillery battery (HKB 16/974 Grönsviken) at Helgeland in Norway, was a German army coastal artillery battery, built between 1942 and 1945 as one of ten coastal batteries in Artillery group Sandnessjöen (Heeres-Küsten-Artillerie-Regiment 974). The coastal battery is today a museum whose purpose is to show the public that the Atlantic Wall in Norway was a lot more than the big naval batteries one can find scattered along the coast. Out of a total of 280 coastal batteries at the end of the war, 210 were army batteries armed with army guns and manned by army personnel and only 70 were naval batteries.

The main task of the artillery group Sandnessjöen was to defend the fjords Sjona, Ranfjord and Vefsnfjorden against an allied invasion. The main road and railway from the south of Norway to Northern Norway ran through the end of these fjords, and with them the supply route to the German Murmansk front and an important supply route for iron from the north of Sweden to Germany.

The main weapons at the fort were four 155 mm K416(f) guns which could shoot a projectile of 43 kg 17,000 meters. The secondary weapon was a 75 mm gun mainly used for warning shots at ships that passed the fort without signalling their intentions, and a 50 mm anti-tank gun used to defend a harbor built by the Germans next to the fort.

The battery was built by 100 Russian and 75 Polish prisoners of war, together with a number of Norwegian workers under the leadership of German troops. We know that at least seven Russian prisoners died at the battery during the construction, but the number is probably much higher. About 150 to 200 German troops were stationed at the battery during the war. The battery was already operational in December 1942, but work continued through the war years. After the war the weapons were demolished and parts of the battery blown up and the rubble used to build a road nearby. Today much of the battery has been rebuilt and is open to visitors all year around. It is easily accessible next to Riksveg 17 just north of Stokkvågen in the municipally of Lurøy, about an hour drive from Mo in Rana. Next to the battery, there is a parking lot and a building with tourist information and toilets. The exhibitions at the museum are open between 8:45 am and 5:00 pm every day between the middle of June and the middle of August. Admission is free. Guided tours and admission to the exhibitions outside opening hours can be arranged through Helgeland Museum or by contacting the tourist information office.

World War II sites in Norway
World War II sites of Nazi Germany